The following are the list of Indonesian diplomats that served as Ambassador of the Republic of Indonesia to the Arab Republic of Egypt.

Sources 
 https://web.archive.org/web/20150208161159/http://www.kemlu.go.id/cairo/Lists/AboutUs/DispForm.aspx?ID=6&ContentTypeId=0x0100E498203E4E1AF24C971D7D007AD90B09

 
Indonesia
Egypt